Loha means Iron in Hindi

Loha may also refer to:

Places
 Loha, Nanded, a town in Nanded district, Maharashtra state of India
 Loha (Vidhan Sabha constituency), assembly constituency in Maharashtra state of India
 Loha taluka, tehsil in Maharashtra state of India

Films
 Loha (1987 film), directed by Raj N. Sippy
 Loha (1997 film), directed by Kanti Shah
 Loha (2004 film), a Pakistani film of 2004

See also
 Loha Singh, 1966 Bhojpuri language Indian film